Class 153 may refer to:

British Rail Class 153
Kaidai-type submarine, also known as I-153 class